An election to the County Council of London took place on 13 April 1961. It proved to be the last election to the council, and plans for its replacement by the Greater London Council were already in process. The council was elected by First Past the Post with each elector having three votes in the three-member seats.

Campaign
The campaign attracted little attention.  The Conservative Party campaign focused on housing issues.  The London Labour Party organised a tour of twenty cars through South East London, carrying politicians who made short speeches at numerous locations in the area.  Other election issues included the proposed construction of the Royal National Theatre, and the London Ringways road schemes.

Results
The Labour Party lost seventeen seats to the Conservative Party, but still secured a substantial majority of seats on the council.  This ensured that the Labour Party would complete thirty years in control of the council.

The Liberal Party was hopeful of winning at least one seat in the election, but it failed to do so.  The Independent Labour Party, Union Movement and British National Party also stood candidates but failed to secure any seats, as did assorted independent candidates.

Turnout in the election was 34.7%, an increase of 3.2% over the previous election.  A closely fought contest in Fulham led to a turnout of 47%, a record for the seat.

References

London County Council election
County Council election
London County Council
London County Council elections
London County Council election